Ege is a Turkish and Norwegian surname. Notable people with the name include:

 Andrew Ege (1812–1876), American lawyer, farmer and politician
 Carl Johan Ege (1852–1943), Norwegian banker
 Cody Ege (born 1991), American former professional baseball pitcher
 Didem Ege (born 1988), Turkish volleyball player
 Ece Ege (born 1963), Turkish-French fashion designer and founder of the prêt-à-porter line DICE KAYEK
 George Ege (1748–1829), politician from Philadelphia
 Hettie Belle Ege (1861–1942), American mathematician
 İbrahim Ege (born 1983), Turkish retired football player
 Julie Ege (1943–2008), Norwegian actress and model
 Otto Ege (1888–1951), American educator
 Steinar Ege (born 1972), retired Norwegian handballer

References

Turkish-language surnames
Norwegian-language surnames
Toponymic surnames